Jacinta Ermacora is an Australian politician. She is a member of the Victorian Legislative Council representing Western Victoria since November 2022. Ermacora is a member of the Labor Party.

References 

Living people
Members of the Victorian Legislative Council
Australian Labor Party members of the Parliament of Victoria
21st-century Australian politicians
Year of birth missing (living people)